Madawaska Valley District High School (MVDHS) is a public high school situated in the village of Barry's Bay, Ontario. It is managed by Renfrew County District School Board. The school was opened in 1967, and has been operating as the public high school for the area ever since. M.V.D.H.S. is one of few high schools in the area, and as of 2012, is attended by 419 students, offering classes for students in grades 9-12. Some of the faculty are M.V. Graduates. In 2016 The Schools "Sherwood Public School" And "Madawaska Valley District High School" merged Into One Building.

Identity 
The school colours are navy blue and brown. The school's team name is "Wolves" and the new Mascot's name is "Waska".

Alumni 
Notable alumni of MVDHS include:
Larry Trader, retired NHL hockey player
Benjamin Rivers, illustrator/game designer 
Dr. Jack Kitts, CEO of The Ottawa Hospital
Sean Conway, university professor and former MPP
Kelly Summers, drafted by the Ottawa Senators (2014)
Patricia Burchat, particle physicist at Stanford University

Sports 
Madawaska Valley District High School offers many sports for its students, both male and female. Fall sports include girls rugby, girls basketball, boys volleyball and co-ed cross country. Winter sports include girls volleyball, boys basketball, and alpine skiing and hockey for both genders. Spring sports include girls soccer, boys soccer, tennis, golf, badminton, and track and field. In the past the Wolves have been known for excellence in volleyball, and this is clearly shown on the sports plaque in the school's gymnasium.

See also
List of high schools in Ontario

References

External links 
  Madawaska Valley District High School 

High schools in Renfrew County
1967 establishments in Ontario
Educational institutions established in 1967